Eric Sorensen may refer to:

Eric Sorensen (civil servant), English civil servant
Eric Sorensen (journalist), Canadian journalist
Eric Sorensen (politician) (born 1976), American politician

See also
Erik Sørensen (born 1940), Danish footballer